Florian Kringe (born 18 August 1982) is a German former professional footballer who played as a midfielder.

Career
Born in Siegen, Kringe started his career with TSV Weißtal and Sportfreunde Siegen. From 1994 to 2002 he played for Borussia Dortmund at various levels, before joining 1. FC Köln on loan for two years. In 2004, he rejoined his parent club and became a regular in the first team for a number of years. On 31 August 2009, he joined Hertha BSC on a one-year loan, before returning to BVB again.

He left Borussia Dortmund at the end of the 2011–12 season and signed a one-year contract with FC St. Pauli on 24 July 2012.

Honours
Borussia Dortmund
 Bundesliga: 2001–02, 2010–11, 2011–12
DFB-Pokal: 2011–12
 UEFA Cup Runners Up: 2002

References

External links
 

1982 births
Living people
Sportspeople from Siegen
German footballers
Association football midfielders
Germany B international footballers
Germany under-21 international footballers
Germany youth international footballers
Sportfreunde Siegen players
Bundesliga players
2. Bundesliga players
Borussia Dortmund players
Borussia Dortmund II players
1. FC Köln players
Hertha BSC players
Footballers from North Rhine-Westphalia